Samuel B. Hill (born 1862) was a teacher, school administrator and state legislator in Ohio. He was born in Xenia, Ohio. He was a Republican. He served in the Ohio House of Representatives in 1894 and 1895.

See also
African-American officeholders during and following the Reconstruction era
List of African-American officeholders (1900-1959)

References

Members of the Ohio House of Representatives
1862 births
Year of death missing